1823 is a 24x7 one-stop hotline services operated by the Government of Hong Kong. It answers public enquiries on behalf of more than 20 participating departments and receives public complaints against the Government. It also act as a platform for resolving cross-departmental complaints. For enquiries regarding Departments not covered by 1823, the Call Centre can provide relevant contact information. Public enquiries or complaints can be made by phone, fax, SMS, email, online, or post.

History
1823 was launched by the Efficiency Unit of the Government Secretariat in July 2001 and became fully operational in October 2002. It aims as a replacement of telephone hotlines, fax numbers, email and other addresses operated by various government departments. In 2009, the Centre answered over 2.4 million calls. Over 16.5 million calls have been answered in ten years' time.

References

2001 establishments in Hong Kong
Hong Kong government departments and agencies